Lanksaare is a village in Saarde Parish, Pärnu County in southwestern Estonia, by the border of Latvia.

Most of the village's territory is covered by the Sookuninga Nature Reserve.

As of 2011 Census, the settlement's population was 11.

References

Villages in Pärnu County